Margaret Elisabeth Jull Costa OBE, OIH (born 2 May 1949) is a British translator of Portuguese- and Spanish-language fiction and poetry, including the works of Nobel Prize winner José Saramago, Eça de Queiroz, Fernando Pessoa, Paulo Coelho, Bernardo Atxaga, Carmen Martín Gaite, Javier Marías, and José Régio. She has won the Oxford-Weidenfeld Translation Prize more times than any other translator.

Early life 
Costa was born in Richmond upon Thames in 1949.

Education 
She earned an undergraduate degree in Spanish and Portuguese from the University of Bristol before receiving a Fulbright Scholarship to Stanford University, where she achieved a Master of Arts.

Writing career
In recent years she has been noted for her work in translating the novels of José Saramago for which she won a number of awards. Her translations include All the Names, and Death at Intervals, about a country where death ceases to exist, was published in 2008.

As part of its 'Europe 1992–2004' programme, the UK publishers Dedalus embarked on a series of new translations by Jull Costa of some of the major classics of Portuguese literature. These include seven works by Eça de Queiroz: Cousin Bazilio (1878, translation published 2003, funded by the Arts Council of England), The Tragedy of the Street of Flowers, The Mandarin (and Other Stories), The Relic, The Crime of Father Amaro, The Maias and The City and the Mountains (2008).

In 2006, she published the translation of the first part of Javier Marías's trilogy, Your Face Tomorrow 1: Fever and Spear. The second part, 2: Dance and Dream, was published in 2006, while the concluding part, 3: Poison, Shadow and Farewell, appeared in November 2009. This last volume won her the 2010 Premio Valle-Inclan.

Her English translation of The Accordionist's Son by the Basque author Bernardo Atxaga was published by Harvill Secker (2007) while her previous translations of Atxaga's work include The Lone Man (1996) and The Lone Woman (1999).

Her translation of The Maias by Eça de Queiroz was published by Dedalus Books in 2007, the original book was described by José Saramago as "the greatest book by Portugal's greatest novelist".

In 2008, as first of a new Dedalus Euro Shorts series, Jull Costa made the first-ever English translation of Helena, or The Sea in Summer, Julián Ayesta's enduring, pointillist novel, first published in Spain in 1952 as Hélena o el mar del verano, and for which he is most remembered. Her biographical introduction to the book provides English-language readers with a brief but essential portrait of Ayesta (1919–1996),  author, Spanish diplomat and outspoken critic of Francoist Spain.

Selected translations

 Alberto Barrera Tyszka – Crimes
 Alberto Barrera Tyszka – The Sickness
 Álvaro Pombo – The Hero of the Big House
Ana Luísa Amaral – What's in a Name
 Ángela Vallvey – Happy Creatures
Ángela Vallvey – Hunting the Last Wild Man
 António Lobo Antunes – The Land at the End of the World
 Antonio Tabucchi – Requiem: A Hallucination
 Arturo Pérez-Reverte – The Flanders Panel
 Arturo Pérez-Reverte – The Club Dumas
 Arturo Pérez-Reverte – The Fencing Master
 Benito Pérez Galdós – Tristana
 Bernardo Atxaga – Obabakoak 
 Bernardo Atxaga – The Lone Man
 Bernardo Atxaga – The Lone Woman
 Bernardo Atxaga – The Adventures of Shola
 Bernardo Atxaga – Shola and the Lions
 Bernardo Atxaga – The Accordionist's Son
 Carmen Martín Gaite – Variable Cloud
Carmen Martín Gaite – The Farewell Angel
 Diogo Mainardi – The Fall: A Father's Memoir in 424 Steps
 Fernando Pessoa – The Book of Disquiet
 Helen Constantine (editor) – Madrid Tales
 Javier García Sánchez – The Others
 Javier Marías – All Souls
 Javier Marías – The Man of Feeling
 Javier Marías – When I Was Mortal
 Javier Marias – Tomorrow in the Battle Think on Me
 Javier Marías – A Heart So White
 Javier Marías – The Infatuations
 Javier Marías – Thus Bad Begins 
 Javier Marías – Berta Isla
 Javier Marías – Your Face Tomorrow: Fever and Spear
 Javier Marías – Your Face Tomorrow: Dance and Dream
 Javier Marías – Your Face Tomorrow: Poison, Shadow, and Farewell 
 Javier Marías – While the Women Are Sleeping
 Javier Marías – Written Lives
 Jesús Carrasco – Out in the Open
 Jorge de Sena – The Prodigious Physician
 José Maria de Eça de Queirós – The Maias
 José Maria de Eça de Queirós – The City and the Mountains
 José Maria de Eça de Queirós – The Crime of Father Amaro
 José Maria de Eça de Queirós – Alves & Co. and Other Stories
 José Maria de Eça de Queirós – The Mandarin and other stories
 José Maria de Eça de Queirós – Cousin Bazilio
 Eça de Queirós – The Tragedy of the Street of Flowers
 Eça de Queirós – The Mystery of the Sintra Road (with Nick Phillips)
 Eça de Queirós – The Relic
 Eça de Queirós – The Illustrious House of Ramires
 José Régio – The Flame-Coloured Dress
 José Saramago – Death with Interruptions
 José Saramago – The Double
 José Saramago – Skylight
 José Saramago – The Elephant's Journey
 José Saramago – Cain
 José Saramago – All the Names
 José Saramago – The Cave
 José Saramago – Raised from the Ground
 José Saramago – Small Memories
 José Saramago – The Tale of the Unknown Island
 José Saramago – Seeing
 José Saramago – Blindness
 Juan José Saer – The Witness
 Julián Ayesta – Helena, or the Sea in Summer
 Júlio Dinis – An English Family
 Julio Llamazares – The Yellow Rain
 Lídia Jorge – The Painter of Birds
 Luís Cardoso – The Crossing: A Story of East Timor
 Luis Fernando Verissimo – Borges and the Eternal Orangutans
 Luis Fernando Verissimo – The Spies
 Luis Fernando Verissimo – The Club of Angels
 Luisa Valenzuela – Bedside Manners
 Luisa Valenzuela – Symmetries
Machado de Assis – The Collected Stories of Machado de Assis
Machado de Assis – Posthumous Memoirs of Brás Cubas
 Manuel Rivas – Butterfly's Tongue
 Marcos Giralt Torrente – Paris
 Mário de Sá-Carneiro – Lucio's Confession
 Mário de Sá-Carneiro – The Great Shadow And Other Stories
 Michel Laub – Diary of the Fall
 Paulo Coelho – Eleven Minutes
 Paulo Coelho – Like the Flowing River
 Paulo Coelho – The Zahir
 Paulo Coelho – Manuscript Found in Accra
 Paulo Coelho – Aleph
 Paulo Coelho – Adultery
 Paulo Coelho – Brida
 Paulo Coelho – Veronika Decides to Die
 Paulo Coelho – The Witch of Portobello
 Rafael Chirbes – On the Edge
 Rafael Sánchez Ferlosio – The Adventures of the Ingenious Alfanhi
 Rafael Sánchez Ferlosio  – The River: El Jarama
 Ramón Valle-Inclán – Spring and Summer Sonatas: The Memoirs of the Marquis of Bradomin
 Ramón del Valle-Inclán – Autumn & Winter Sonatas: The Memoirs of Marquis of Bradomin
 Sophia de Mello Breyner Andresen – The Perfect Hour (co-translator: Colin Rorrison)
 Teolinda Gersão – The Word Tree
 The Dedalus Book of Portuguese Fantasy
 The Dedalus Book of Spanish Fantasy

Awards and honours
1992 Portuguese Translation Prize winner for translation of The Book of Disquiet by Fernando Pessoa
1996 Portuguese Translation Prize runner-up for translation of The Relic by Eça de Queiroz
1997 International Dublin Literary Award winner for translation of A Heart So White by Javier Marías
2000 Oxford-Weidenfeld Translation Prize winner for translation of All the Names by José Saramago
2002 Portuguese Translation Prize runner-up for translation of The Migrant Painter of Birds by Lídia Jorge
2006 Oxford-Weidenfeld Translation Prize shortlist for translation of Your Face Tomorrow 1: Fever and Spear by Javier Marías
2006 Arts Council, Spanish Embassy and Instituto Cervantes translation prize winner for Your Face Tomorrow 1: Fever and Spear by Javier Marías
2008 PEN/Book-of-the-Month Club Translation Prize winner for translation of The Maias by Eça de Queiroz
2008 Oxford-Weidenfeld Translation Prize winner for translation of The Maias by Eça de Queiroz
2010 Times Literary Supplement Translation Prize winner for translation of The Accordionist's Son by Bernardo Atxaga
2011 Oxford-Weidenfeld Translation Prize winner for translation of The Elephant's Journey by José Saramago
2012 Calouste Gulbenkian Prize winner for translation of The Word Tree by Teolinda Gersão
2012 Calouste Gulbenkian Prize runner-up for translation of The Land at the End of the World by António Lobo Antunes
2013 Fellow of the Royal Society of Literature
2014 Officer of the Order of the British Empire (OBE) in the 2014 Birthday Honours
2015 Jewish Quarterly-Wingate Prize winner for translation of Diary of the Fall
2015 Awarded the degree of Doctor of Letters honoris causa by the University of Leeds
2017 The Premio Valle-Inclán by the Society of Authors for her translation of On the Edge by Rafael Chirbes
2017 Officer of the Order of Prince Henry

References

External links
Dedalus Books, Sawtry, Cambridgeshire, UK Publishers
An Interview with Margaret Jull Costa; 2 November 2009

1949 births
Living people
Portuguese–English translators
Spanish–English translators
Translators of Fernando Pessoa
Fellows of the Royal Society of Literature
Officers of the Order of the British Empire
Officers of the Order of Prince Henry
20th-century British translators
British women writers
Winners of the Marsh Award for Children's Literature in Translation